Nero Wolfe is a 1979 American made-for-television film adaptation of the Nero Wolfe novel The Doorbell Rang by Rex Stout. Thayer David stars as Nero Wolfe, gourmet, connoisseur and detective genius. Tom Mason costars as Archie Goodwin, Wolfe's assistant. Written and directed by Frank D. Gilroy, the made-for-TV movie was produced by Paramount Television as a pilot for an ABC television series, but the movie was shelved by the network for more than two years before finally being broadcast December 19, 1979.

Production
Disappointed with the Columbia Pictures films based on his first two Nero Wolfe novels, mystery writer Rex Stout was leery of further Hollywood adaptations in his lifetime. "I've had offers," Stout told author Dick Lochte in 1967, "but I haven't been to a movie in 30 years and I despise television. ... Anyway, the money, in addition to what the books are bringing in, would put me in a tax bracket where I wouldn't see much of it. If the characters are any good for films or television they'll be just as good 10 years from now." Ten years later, a little more than a year after Stout's death, literary agent H.N. Swanson negotiated an agreement for a Nero Wolfe television movie.

In 1976 Paramount Television purchased the rights for the entire set of Nero Wolfe stories for Orson Welles. Paramount paid $200,000 for the TV rights to eight hours of Nero Wolfe. The producers planned to begin with an ABC-TV movie and hoped to persuade Welles to continue the role in a mini-series. Frank D. Gilroy was signed to write the television script ("The Doorbell Rang") and direct the TV movie on the assurance that Welles would star, but by April 1977 Welles had bowed out.

"I was told to discover someone for the role since no other name actors were acceptable to them (ABC/Paramount) or to me," Gilroy wrote in his memoir, I Wake Up Screening (1993). "After a bicoastal search, which acquainted me with just about every corpulent middle-aged actor available, I, close to giving up, encountered Thayer David. No sooner did he start to read than Emmet Lavery, the producer, and I exchanged a look: We'd found our man."

At a cost of about $1.5 million, Nero Wolfe was filmed in March, April and May 1977, in locales including Van Nuys and Malibu, California, and New York City. The scene in which Mrs. Rachel Bruner (Anne Baxter) goes ice skating was filmed at Rockefeller Center.

In June 1977, UPI reported that the two-hour film would air during the 1977–78 season, with the possibility of it becoming a weekly series in January 1978. But the film had still not aired when Thayer David died in July 1978. In a November 1979 interview, Gilroy mildly complained to the Associated Press that Nero Wolfe had still not been broadcast by ABC, and praised the performance of David. "It doesn't affect my career one way or the other that they haven't shown it, but that was the most important thing he ever did on film, and I'm determined to get it aired," Gilroy said.

Nero Wolfe was finally broadcast by ABC-TV at midnight December 18, 1979. Asked why the movie had not been run before, a former ABC executive familiar with the movie's development said, "It wasn't very good. It was very slow and plodding and talky. We just felt it wouldn't get any numbers." Asked why it had finally been scheduled, a network staffer speculated, "It's called 'dusting off the shelf.'"

Frank Gilroy was recognized with an Edgar Award nomination by the Mystery Writers of America in 1980.

In January 1981, Paramount Television's one-hour weekly series Nero Wolfe, starring William Conrad, began a 14-episode run on NBC.

Cast

 Thayer David as Nero Wolfe
 Tom Mason as Archie Goodwin
 Brooke Adams as Sarah Dacos
 Biff McGuire as Inspector Cramer
 John Randolph as Lon Cohen
 Anne Baxter as Mrs. Rachel Bruner
 David Hurst as Fritz
 John O'Leary as Theodore Horstmann
 Sarah Cunningham as Mrs. Althaus
 Lewis Charles as Saul Panzer
 Frank Campanella as Fred Durkin
 John Gerstad as Dr. Vollmer
 John Hoyt as Hewitt
 Ivor Francis as Evers
 Allen Case as Rugby
 Rod Browning as 2nd FBI Man
 Katharine Charles as Marian Hinckley
 Joe George as O'Dell
 Richard Ford Grayling as 1st FBI Man
 David Lewis as Mr. Althaus
 Robert Phalen as Yarmack
 Sam Weisman as Quayle

Reviews and commentary
 James Bawden, Toronto Star — This adaptation of Rex Stout's The Doorbell Rang is way above average.
 Paula Vitaris, Scarlet Street — Not surprisingly, this version played fast and loose with the original story, even implying a romantic relationship between the notoriously woman-shy Wolfe and wealthy widow Rachel Bruner (Anne Baxter), at whose behest Wolfe had taken on one of his most formidable foes, the FBI.

Home media

In 2003 AudioVision Canada released Nero Wolfe on DVD, in a described edition for the blind and those with diminished vision. 

On May 3, 2017, VEI announced a DVD release for the 1981 TV series starring William Conrad. Reported to be "coming soon", Rex Stout's Nero Wolfe: The Complete Series will include the 1977 pilot starring Thayer David.

References

External links

1977 television films
1977 films
American television films
English-language television shows
Nero Wolfe
Films scored by Leonard Rosenman
Films based on American novels
Films shot in California
Films shot in New York City
Films directed by Frank D. Gilroy